Shirl's Neighbourhood was an Australian afternoon children's television series aired on the Seven Network between 1979 and 1983. The half-hour show featured former Skyhooks frontman Graeme "Shirley" Strachan and co-host Liz Rule alongside a cast of characters including Norm The Kangaroo, Ol' Possum, Claude The Crow, Stanley The Snake, Greenfinger the Garden Gnome, Yippee the Bunyip, Bartholomew the Sheep and a band of monkeys. Franciscus Henri appeared in the show as a regular, both as himself presenting musical segments and as "Professor Henri" in comical sketches. He left the show in October 1980.

Norm the Kangaroo was played by Don Bridges. The other characters were puppets created and brought to life by Ron Mueck.

Production
Shirl's Neighbourhood was produced by Jenifer Hooks and Richard Bence of Puppetstuff. It ran from 1979 till 1983 and clocked up over 900 episodes. Jenifer Hooks later went on to head Film Victoria and Cinemedia.

The show was very popular with kids and adults alike. This was due mainly to the character of Claude the Crow. Claude had a slightly more cynical view of the world than the other characters, and adults could identify with this.

References

Notes
National Film and Sound Archive – Bulletin 2

External links
Photograph of "Shirl" and "Norm the Kangaroo" (Monash University Archives)
Darrin's Shirl's Neighbourhood Shrine 
Shirl's Neighbourhood at the National Film and Sound Archive

1979 Australian television series debuts
1983 Australian television series endings
Australian television shows featuring puppetry
Television shows set in Melbourne
Australian children's television series
Australian preschool education television series
Seven Network original programming